Lippendorf Power Station is a lignite-fired power station in Lippendorf, which is located in the municipality of Neukieritzsch, near Leipzig in Saxony, Germany. The power plant is owned and operated by Vattenfall Europe.

Old power station
The Lippendorf old power station was built between 1964 and 1968. It generated 600 megawatts (MW) having four 100 MW and four 50 MW units. The old power station was decommissioned in 2000 when the new power station became operational.

This flue gas stack briefly was the tallest in the world.

Modernization
Lippendorf Power Station was replaced between 1997 and 2000 by a modern power plant, which has two units by the capacity of  each which have an efficiency of 42.4%  The plant also has a district heating capability of 300 MW. The plant was the biggest private building project in Saxony. The power blocks are amongst that tallest industrial buildings in the world rising 170 m (558 ft) tall.

References

External links

Portable Power Station

Coal-fired power stations in Germany
Buildings and structures in Saxony
Towers in Germany
Vattenfall